Ophiusa is a genus of moths in the family Erebidae erected by Ferdinand Ochsenheimer in 1816.

Description
Palpi upturned and smoothly scaled, where the second joint reaching vertex of head and third joint variable in length and longer in female than male. Thorax and abdomen smoothly scaled. Mid tibia spiny and sometimes hind tibia as well. Tibia fringed with long hair in male. Forewings with somewhat acute apex. The outer margin nearly straight. Hindwings with slightly angled outer margin at vein 2. Larva with four pairs of abdominal prolegs, where the first pair or two pairs are rudimentary.

Species

Ophiusa coronata Fabricius, 1775 is now placed in Thyas as Thyas coronata.

References

Ophiusa
Moth genera